Xantheia Pennisi (born 26 November 1998) is an Australian high diver. She represented Australia at the 2019 World Aquatics Championships in Gwangju, South Korea and she finished in 6th place in the women's high diving event.

In 2019, she finished in 9th place in the 2019 Red Bull Cliff Diving World Series.

References 

Living people
1998 births
Place of birth missing (living people)
Female high divers
Australian female divers
20th-century Australian women
21st-century Australian women